Home for Christmas is the tenth studio album by Christian music and pop music singer Amy Grant, released on October 6, 1992. It is Grant's second holiday album, the first being 1983's A Christmas Album.

Commercial performance 
Coming off the heels of Grant's successful 1991 album, Heart in Motion, Home for Christmas performed even better than Heart in Motion on the Billboard charts, reaching No. 2 on the Billboard 200 and No. 1 on the Christian album chart. It was later reissued in 2003 as 20th Century Masters – The Christmas Collection: The Best of Amy Grant.

On November 17, 1997, Home for Christmas was certified Triple Platinum by the Recording Industry Association of America for shipment of three million copies in the United States.

As of November 2014, Home for Christmas is the eighteenth best-selling Christmas/holiday album in the U.S. during the Nielsen SoundScan era of music sales tracking (March 1991 – present), having sold 2,540,000 copies according to SoundScan.

Track listing

Personnel 

 Amy Grant – lead vocals
 Shane Keister – acoustic piano (4, 10), keyboards (8, 10, 11), string arrangements (10)
 Carl Marsh – synthesizer (4), keyboards (11, 12), orchestration (12)
 Robbie Buchanan – keyboards (6)
 Clare Fischer – acoustic piano (9)
 Blair Masters – keyboards (10, 11)
 Phil Keaggy – guitars (5)
 Tom Hemby – guitar (6, 12), acoustic guitar (10)
 Jerry McPherson – guitar (7), acoustic guitar (10)
 Dann Huff – guitar (10)
 Craig Nelson – bass (7, 9)
 David Hungate – bass (8, 10)
 Chris McHugh – drums (7)
 Steve Forman – percussion (7)
 Paul Leim – drums (8, 10), percussion (10)
 Harold Jones – drums (9)
 Mark O'Connor – violin (12)
 Ronn Huff – orchestration (1, 2, 3, 9), choral arrangements (3, 5, 11), conductor
 Alan Moore – orchestration (6)
 The London Studio Orchestra – strings (1, 2, 3, 6, 9, 10, 12)
 Nat Peck – contractor
 The American Boychoir (3, 5, 10), directed by James Litton
 Chris Eaton – backing vocals (2, 7, 11), piano (11)
 Marty McCall – backing vocals (2, 7, 10)
 Marabeth Jordan – backing vocals (2, 7, 10)
 Bonnie Keen – backing vocals (2, 7, 10)
 John Darnall – children's choir director (10)
 Children's choir (10) – Jessica Owen, Kristina Owen, Carrie Gardner, Lisa Pardin, Asher Larrison, Emily Estes, Bethany Wright, Skyla Carnahan, Katy Dunham and Ellie Bannister

Production
 Brown Bannister – producer
 Ronn Huff – producer (2, 3)
 Amy Grant – executive producer
 Michael Blanton – executive producer
 Bill Deaton – tracking engineer
 Patrick Kelly – assistant engineer
 Rich Indelicato – assistant engineer
 Greg Parker – assistant engineer
 Steve Bishir – overdub engineer
 Anthony Zecco – overdub assistant engineer
 Brett Perry – overdub assistant engineer
 Martin Woodlee – overdub assistant engineer
 Rail Rogut – overdub assistant engineer
 Michael O'Reilly – additional engineering
 Adrian Kerridge – orchestra sessions engineer
 James Collins – orchestra sessions assistant engineer
 Bill Schnee – mixing
 Noel Hazen – mix assistant
 Doug Sax – mastering at The Mastering Lab, Los Angeles
 Steve Hall – remastering at Futuredisc, North Hollywood
 Traci Sterling – production coordinator
 Chuck Beeson – art direction, design 
 Rich Frankel – art direction
 Rebecca Chamlee – design
 Victoria Pearson Cameron – photography

Charts

Weekly charts

Year-end charts

Certifications

References 

1992 Christmas albums
Christmas albums by American artists
Amy Grant albums
Albums produced by Brown Bannister
Pop Christmas albums
A&M Records albums